Roger Jones may refer to:

Roger Jones (footballer, born 1902) (1902–1967), English football wing-half
Roger Jones (footballer, born 1946) (born 1946), English football goalkeeper
Roger Jones (American football) (born 1969), American football player 
Roger Jones (mathematician), American mathematician
Roger Jones (composer) (born 1948), British composer and musician
Roger Jones (physicist) (born 1953), American physicist and entrepreneur
Roger Jones, 1st Viscount Ranelagh (before 1589–1643), member of the Peerage of Ireland and lord president of Connaught
Roger Jones (MP) (c. 1691–1741), British Member of Parliament for Brecon
Roger Jones (Adjutant General) (1789–1852), Adjutant General of the U.S. Army from 1825 to 1852
Roger Jones (Inspector General) (1831–1889), Inspector General of the U.S. Army from 1888 to 1889 (son of the above)
Roger Jones (poet) (born 1954), American poet
Roger Jones (pharmacist) (born 1943), British businessman
Roger Jones (physician) (born 1948), British general practitioner
Roger W. Jones (1908–1993), U.S. government official
Roger Jones (bowls), Welsh lawn bowler